Zykov Konets is a rural locality (a village) in Moseyevskoye Rural Settlement, Totemsky District, Vologda Oblast, Russia. The population was 5 as of 2002.

Geography 
Zykov Konets is located 30 km northwest of Totma (the district's administrative centre) by road. Kholkin Konets is the nearest rural locality.

References 

Rural localities in Tarnogsky District